Ebenator (popularly known as Ebenator Ozulogu) is a town in Nnewi South Local Government Area of Anambra State, south-eastern Nigeria, predominantly occupied by Igbo speaking people. Ebenator is blessed with good weather and fertile lands, as it is surrounded by natural water. Ebenator people are hardworking, and can be found in different parts of the country and overseas where they seek their fortunes. The Igbo people living around there live in families close to each other and are predominantly Christians.

Name
The town is called 'Ebenator Ozulogu' because of her great deeds in the past. According to oral history, the town, not withstanding her smallness, was very mighty, and fought with virtually all her neighbouring communities who attempted to annex, plunder, raid, incur, pillage or even annihilate her because of her smallness in those olden days. The town was indomitable and able to wage war with all those neighbouring communities, and emerge victorious because of the powerful god —Akwai, and goddess — Ofala which the people worshipped then.

Villages
Ebenator is made up of three villages, namely: Umunnama, Umuonyeukpa and Ubaha.

History
The name Ebenator was coined in 1918 by an Anglican church Teacher posted to the community, by name, Mr. Peter Onwuemerie. Then, these three autonomous villages hitherto had no one general name, by which they were addressed as a community, until Onwuemerie suggested Ebonator (meaning three villages/regions), a name which the community leaders and members swiftly subscribed to, and which later became pronounced as Ebenator, the name the community bears till today.

Geography
Ebenator shares boundary with other communities in Nnewi South Local Government, such as Ukpor, Ezinifite, Osumenyi, Utuh. It was Ebenator town that produced the first trained teacher, the first university graduate, the first medical doctor, and first professor in the entire Mbanese, which is a general name for a conglomerate of five (out of ten) communities that make up the local government. These communities are Ebenator, Ezinifite, Akwaihedi, Osumenyi and Utuh.

Government
The town's apex body is the Ebenator Development Union (E.D.U.), with Chief Anthony Okechukwu as the current President General. The Traditional Ruler of the community, H.R.H. Igwe Chinewubeze Ezejiburu is the longest-serving monarch in the entire Nnewi South.

Environmental challenges
One of the greatest challenges confronting Ebenator Community is gully erosion. The community has a gully erosion site popularly known as Ibo Ebenator which is one of the deepest gully erosion sites in the entire south-eastern Nigeria.

The gully roots from a neighbouring community, Osumenyi and stretches down to the popular Ofala River in Ebenator. It has claimed lives of many innocent citizens, pulled and caved down many houses, destroyed crops and farmlands and damaged properties worth millions of Naira.

Notable people

 Sam Uzochukwu (academic and expert on Igbo oral poetry)

References

Populated places in Anambra State